is a private senior high school in Yotsukaidō, Chiba Prefecture, Japan, in the Tokyo metropolitan area.

It originated from the April 1925 establishment of the Kanto Junior High School. On March 31, 1948, the governor of Chiba Prefecture approved the creation of Chiba Kanto High School, which changed its name to Chiba Keiai on July 8, 1958, and moved to its current location on April 8, 1964.

References

External links
 Chiba Keiai Senior High School
 Chiba Keiai Senior High School 

Private schools in Japan
High schools in Chiba Prefecture